Benzo[c]phenanthrene is a polycyclic aromatic hydrocarbon with the chemical formula C18H12. It is a white solid that is soluble in nonpolar organic solvents. It is a nonplanar molecule consisting of the fusion of four fused benzene rings.  The compound is of mainly theoretical interest but it is environmentally occurring and weakly carcinogenic.

References

Polycyclic aromatic hydrocarbons
IARC Group 2B carcinogens
Tetracyclic compounds